Nathan Sharon (November 1925 – 17 June 2011) was an Israeli biochemist.

Biography
Sharon was born in 1925 in Brest-Litovsk, then in Poland (now Brest, Belarus). He emigrated to Mandate Palestine with his family in 1934 and settled in Tel Aviv. Concurrent with his high school studies, Sharon joined the Gadna military youth program in 1941, and following his graduation from school, in 1943, he joined the Palmach, serving until 1945.

During the 1948 Arab–Israeli War, Sharon served in the Science Corps of the Israel Defense Forces, attaining the rank of lieutenant colonel, and worked on the development of gas flame throwers.

Sharon studied chemistry at the Hebrew University of Jerusalem. In 1950, he graduated and, in 1953, he was awarded a doctorate.

In 1954, he joined the faculty of the Department for Biophysics at the Weizmann Institute of Science, headed by professor Ephraim Katzir, where he became a professor in 1968. In 1974, he was appointed head of the department, a position he held intermittently until his retirement in 1990. He also served as dean of the Faculty of Chemistry and Physics and was a visiting professor at Harvard, Oxford universities and the University of California, Berkeley. He was also a member of the senate of the Open University of Israel and a member of the counsel of the Tel Aviv-Yafo Academic College. He served as editor of "World of Science" broadcast on Israel Radio, editor of the journal "Mada" (Science) and science and technology editor of the Haaretz newspaper.

He was a leading figure in the research of carbohydrate and glycoprotein for more than fifty years. He authored several seminal works on lectins and glycoconjugates, including the discovery of lectins, their interactions with carbohydrates, and their subsequent use in laboratory research and diagnostics.

In 1992, he was elected to the Israel Academy of Sciences and Humanities.

He died on 17 June 2011 at the age of 85.

Honours and awards
Sharon received numerous honorary degrees and awards including: 
In 1987, he was awarded the Weizmann Prize for Sciences.
In 1987, he received an honorary doctorate from the University of Paris.
In 1989, he received the Bijvoet Medal of the Bijvoet Center for Biomolecular Research, Utrecht University, NL
In 1994, he was awarded the Israel Prize in biochemistry.

Family
Sharon married Rachel (Itzikson) in 1948 and has two daughters, Esther (Esty) Sharon, and Osnat Bairey.

He was the nephew of Pinchas Sapir, the former Israeli Finance Minister and the brother of Shmuel Shtrikman, who was awarded the 2001 Israel Prize for physics.

Selected works
Sharon published over 400 papers in international scientific journals and wrote or edited eight books in English and Hebrew. His published works include: 
 Lectins, co-authored with Halina Lis (Kluwer Academic Publishers, 2003 (2nd edition)).

See also 
 List of Israel Prize recipients

References

External links
 Protein-Carbohydrate Interactions at the Atomic Level: Studies of Legume Lectins Weizmann Institute of Science. (Also contains list of related publication, including those of Nathan Sharon, from 2002)

1925 births
2011 deaths
Belarusian Jews
People from Brest, Belarus
Polish emigrants to Mandatory Palestine
Jews in Mandatory Palestine
Israeli people of Belarusian-Jewish descent
Israeli biochemists
Israeli military personnel
Hebrew University of Jerusalem alumni
Academic staff of Weizmann Institute of Science
Israel Prize in biochemistry recipients
Members of the Israel Academy of Sciences and Humanities
Members of the Polish Academy of Sciences
Bijvoet Medal recipients